Soof 3 is a 2022 Dutch romantic comedy film directed by Anne de Clercq. On the day of the film's release, it won the Golden Film award after having sold 100,000 tickets. The film also won the Platinum Film award after having sold 400,000 tickets. The film is the sequel to the 2016 film Soof 2.

It was the best visited Dutch film of 2022 with just over 497,000 visitors. The film finished in 13th place in the list of best visited films in the Netherlands in 2022. Lies Visschedijk and Fedja van Huêt play lead roles in the film. The film is the third film in a trilogy.

See also 
 Soof (2013 film)

References

External links 
 

2022 films
2020s Dutch-language films
Dutch romantic comedy films
2022 romantic comedy films
Dutch sequel films
Films shot in the Netherlands